Afaha Ukwa is a village in Eket local government area of Akwa Ibom. It is surrounded by Ata Idung Afaha Ekid, Atai Ndon-Afaha Ekid, Ebana and Ede Urua.

Their language is the Ekid Language.

Afaha Ukwa is one of the host community to Exxon Mobil Airstrip and Technical Training College, an Apex manpower training provider for Mobil producing Nigeria. 

Afaha Ukwa is a relatively peaceful and has a nice serene environment for tourists and visitors as her indigenous are very hospitable; her environments is one of the best place to reside in.

Prominent family clans include Nnug Akpe Obong embracing Atang, Nsien, Nsetuk, Ebitu and Edward family; also the Asong Odiong family and the Afaha Akpong family are the origins of this peaceful land.

Afaha Ukwa is predominantly a Christian Pentecostal community with host of big name churches like The Church of Jesus Christ of Latter Day Saints at SDP road. The Apostolic Church Afaha Ukwa, Qua Iboe Church Obok Idim Methodist church, Faith and Works 
Mount Zion church, Assemblies Of God, and St. Fabian Catholic Church.

Also there are nice hotels and resorts for recreational purposes the likes of Grandville Hotel, Olympus House, Imperial Hotel, Treasure Guest House, and Airstrip Hotel Ydofia Street.

Afaha Uqua community is largely a farming and artisan community.

The present Traditional ruler of Afaha Ukwa is a renowned Medical Practitioner Dr. Okon Nsien 2015 who took over from the late Dr. Sunday Afaha. Ruling Families in Afaha Uqua are the Atang, Afaha, and Nssien family.

See also 
 Afaha Atai
 Ede Urua

References 

Villages in Akwa Ibom